Thomas Jones (1889 – 8 April 1923) was an English professional footballer who played as a goalkeeper.

References

1889 births
1923 deaths
People from Stanton Hill
Footballers from Nottinghamshire
English footballers
Association football goalkeepers
Mansfield Town F.C. players
Grimsby Town F.C. players
New Hucknall Colliery F.C. players
English Football League players